Red Teams or Red Cells are United States government terms for the National Security Co-ordination Team (NSCT). These teams or units are designed to test the effectiveness of American tactics or personnel.

In 1984, Red Cell was formed after Richard Marcinko relinquished command of SEAL Team Six to Commander Robert Gormly. Red Cell members demonstrated the vulnerabilities of military bases and would regularly use false IDs, dismantle fences, barricade buildings, take hostages, and kidnap high ranking personnel. Additionally, Red Cell planted bombs near Air Force One, snuck into submarine bases, and took them over. Their operations were recorded and subsequently displayed to base personnel. This action was partly to humiliate the targets and also give them a look into vulnerabilities that they should patch. "I'd tell them Red Cell was coming, eat them alive, and then show the film and rub their noses in it," Marcinko stated in an interview.

The original Red Cell was a 14-man team composed of 13 former members of SEAL Team Six and one Force Recon Marine. The unit was also known as OP-O6D which had been organized to attempt to infiltrate and otherwise test the security of U.S. military bases and other installations sensitive to U.S. security interests.

The team was led by the former commander of SEAL Team Six (DEVGRU) Richard Marcinko until he was relieved of duty and charged with various offenses including misappropriating funds. It was alleged that these were made up allegations as part of a vendetta against Marcinko, due to anger felt at senior levels at how easily Marcinko and his team had infiltrated bases and procured top secret information from high-ranking individuals. A high-ranking Navy official says there was no vendetta and that "the general take was that Red Cell was a good thing."

Realistic exercise scenarios executed around the world involved documentation using both civilian and military personnel. Remote, fixed and handheld video cameras captured all aspects of the exercises and were used to compile quick-look after-action reviews as well as in-depth lessons learned catalogs.

The name was derived from Red Team, a term for the opposing force in a war game by western nations during the Cold War, a reference to the predominantly red flags of Communist nations (i.e., the USSR and PRC) with the western nations being the Blue Team. The USSR used the same colors, but reversed meaning—they were the Red Team and the OpFor was the Blue Team.

A new Red Cell team was formed by CIA after the 9/11 attacks to brainstorm ways to attack America, in order to come up with security measures to prevent them. Novelist Brad Meltzer was recruited to write plots as part of this program.

1986 kidnapping incident
On March 20, 1986, Red Cell team members kidnapped Ronald D. Sheridan, a civilian security guard who worked at Naval Weapons Station Seal Beach in Southern California as part of an exercise to test the defenses of the base.  They took him to a nearby hotel where he was held for 30 hours and tortured: stripped, kicked, beaten, and repeatedly dunked into a bathtub filled with water and a flushing toilet.  While in theory the kidnapping could prove a weakness, actually committing the torture served no useful purpose.  In addition, the kidnapping was not even successful as a show of weakness; Sheridan's wife saw the suspicious men with a van and got the drop on them with her own pistol, and was only prevented from shooting the would-be kidnappers by her husband calling her off and insisting it was part of an exercise, as he thought at the time it would be a brief matter.  Since Sheridan was not naval personnel, he sued the government afterward.

References

External links
Red Cell at Special Operations.com 
Read the 'Description' section of this web site page by DARPA—archived page

Special Operations Forces of the United States
United States Naval Special Warfare Command